Bakharevka is a rural locality (a village) in Frolovskoye Rural Settlement, Permsky District, Perm Krai, Russia. The population was 75 as of 2010. There are 13 streets.

Geography 
Bakharevka is located 9 km south of Perm (the district's administrative centre) by road. Krokhaleva is the nearest rural locality.

References 

Rural localities in Permsky District